The Penobscot are an indigenous ethnic group of North America.

Penobscot may also refer to:

Places
 Penobscot, Maine
 Fort Pentagouet (or Fort Castine or Fort Penobscot or Fort Saint-Pierre), Castine, Maine
 Penobscot Bay, Maine
 Penobscot County, Maine
 Penobscot Indian Island Reservation, Penobscot County, Maine
 Penobscot Knob, Pennsylvania 
 Penobscot Narrows Bridge and Observatory, Maine
 Penobscot River, Maine

Buildings
 Penobscot Block, Detroit, Michigan
 Penobscot Building, Detroit, Michigan
 Penobscot Building Annex (or Penobscot Annex), Detroit, Michigan
 The Penobscot Building, Detroit, Michigan

Ships
(Chronological order)
 , a gunboat launched 19 November 1861
 , a tug placed in service 29 August 1917
 , a tug launched 11 September 1944

Other uses
 Penobscot Expedition, a failed attempt by American rebels to seize Penobscot, Maine from the British during the American Revolutionary War
 Donald Penobscott, the character Major Margaret "Hot Lips" Houlihan's husband on the TV show M*A*S*H